Mohammad or Muhammad Akram is the name of:

Cricketers
Mohammad Akram (Islamabad cricketer) (born 1974), Pakistani test cricketer
Mohammad Akram (Sindh cricketer) (born 1956), Pakistani first-class cricketer
Mohammad Akram (Lahore Division cricketer) (born 1964), Pakistani first-class cricketer
Muhammad Akram (blind cricketer), Pakistani blind cricketer

Others
Muhammad Akram (1941–1971), Pakistani army officer
Mohammad Akram (rower) (born 1971), Pakistani Olympic rower who competed in the 2000 Summer Olympics
Muhammad Akram (politician) (assumed office 2018), member of the Senate of Pakistan
Mohammad Akram (general) (died 2005), Vice Chief of Staff of the Afghan National Army, killed by a suicide bomb attack

See also
Mohammad Akram Khpalwāk (active 2006–2014), Afghan politician